Eadmund was a 9th-century Englishman. It had been thought he had been Bishop of Winchester between 833 and 838. However, following further studies he is no longer listed to have been bishop.

Notes

References

 
 

9th-century English people
Year of birth unknown
Place of birth unknown
830s deaths
Place of death unknown